The Rio Huancabamba leaf-toed gecko (Phyllodactylus johnwrighti) is a species of lizard in the family Phyllodactylidae. The species is endemic to Peru.

Etymology
The specific name, johnwrighti, is in honor of American herpetologist John William Wright (born 1936).

Geographic range
P. johnwrighti is found on the slopes of the Huancabamba River valley in Cajamarca Region, Peru.

Habitat

Reproduction
P. johnwrighti is oviparous.

References

Further reading
Dixon JR, Huey RB (1970). "Systematics of the Lizards of the Gekkonid Genus Phyllodactylus on Mainland South America". Contributions in Science, Los Angeles County Museum (192): 1–78. (Phyllodactylus johnwrighti, new species, p. 56).
Koch C, Venegas PJ, Santa Cruz R, Böhme W (2018). "Annotated checklist and key to the species of amphibians and reptiles inhabiting the northern Peruvian dry forest along the Andean valley of the Marañón River and its tributaries". Zootaxa 4385 (1): 1–101.
Rösler H (2000). "Kommentierte Liste der rezent, subrezent und fossil bekannten Geckotaxa (Reptilia: Gekkonomorpha)". Gekkota 2: 28–153. (Phyllodactylus johnwrighti, p. 104). (in German).

Phyllodactylus
Reptiles of Peru
Reptiles described in 1970